Nalini Ranjan Ghosh was an Indian politician.  In the 1958 by-election, he was elected to the Lok Sabha from the Cooch Behar constituency. In 1962, he was elected to the Lok Sabha from the Jalpaiguri constituency.  Ghosh was a member of the Indian National Congress party.

References

University of Calcutta alumni
Lok Sabha members from West Bengal
India MPs 1957–1962
India MPs 1962–1967
People from Jalpaiguri
Date of birth missing
Date of death missing
People from Cooch Behar district